Khristo Petrov Donchev (born 24 June 1932) is a former Bulgarian basketball player. He competed in the men's tournament at the 1952 Summer Olympics.

References

External links

1932 births
Living people
Bulgarian men's basketball players
Olympic basketball players of Bulgaria
Basketball players at the 1952 Summer Olympics
Place of birth missing (living people)